May–White syndrome is a rare familial progressive myoclonus epilepsy with lipomas, deafness, and ataxia. This syndrome is probably a familial form of mitochondrial encephalomyopathy.

References

Mitochondrial diseases
Neurotrauma
Syndromes